Osman Atılgan (born 1 August 1999) is a German-Turkish professional footballer who plays as a forward for 1. FC Lokomotive Leipzig.

Career
Atılgan made his professional debut for Dynamo Dresden in the 2. Bundesliga on 23 December 2018, coming on as a substitute in the 69th minute for Barış Atik in the 3–1 away win against MSV Duisburg.

On 23 August 2019, Atılgan joined Hansa Rostock on a season-long loan deal.

References

External links
 
 
 

1999 births
Living people
German people of Turkish descent
People from Nordenham
Footballers from Lower Saxony
Association football forwards
German footballers
Turkish footballers
VfB Oldenburg players
Dynamo Dresden players
FC Hansa Rostock players
SC Preußen Münster players
FC Rot-Weiß Koblenz players
1. FC Lokomotive Leipzig players
2. Bundesliga players
3. Liga players
Regionalliga players